Nate Augspurger (born January 31, 1990) is an American rugby union player from Minneapolis, Minnesota who plays scrum-half for the San Diego Legion in Major League Rugby (MLR).

Professional rugby career

Augspurger has been a member of the United States national rugby sevens team since the 2012–13 Sevens World Series. He debuted on the World Series Circuit in Dubai and Port Elizabeth, 2012. Augspurger battled injury through his first year as a full time USA sevens resident, which led to missing out on the 7's RWC in Russia, 2013. Shortly after that first full year, he was cut by new Head Coach, Matt Hawkins, before the new year in 2014. In 2013, Nate played with the New York City 7's in the inaugural World Club Series Sevens tournament at Twickenham. He was the first player to score a try in the tournament against the Western Province, and the NYC 7's went on to win the Plate Championship.

Augspurger had a brief tour with the USA Men's XVs in the Americas Rugby Championships in the fall of 2014. But it was in 2015 when Augspurger was invited back into the USA sevens program after showing well in the Las Vegas Invitational. Mike Friday, new USA Sevens Head Coach, selected Nate for the World Series Circuit in 2015 to Hong Kong and Japan. He was then selected to Glasgow and London 7's to finish the World Series season, where the USA went on to win their 1st ever tournament final at Twickenham in the London Sevens stop. He was also member of the same sevens team that won a bronze medal at the 2015 Pan American Games. Augspurger then was offered a full-time resident contract with the sevens team from 2015-2016 leading up to the Rio de Janeiro Olympics. Augspurger was selected for every tournament in the 2015-2016 season. He was selected for the Olympic qualifier tournament where the USA qualified for the 2016 games. Augspurger was selected to the 2016 Olympic games as a traveling reserve player. After that tournament, Augspurger made a code switch from Sevens to Rugby Union where he continued his USA rugby career.

Augspurger received his first USA XV cap against Italy, the summer of 2016 from Head Coach, John Mitchell. He started at scrum half in the Eagles 20-24 loss to Italy. Augspurger became Eagle no. 491. This was the beginning of a new chapter and main stay for Augspurger. He received his 2nd cap against Russia that summer, played that fall at scrum half against the NZ Maori All Blacks (non test), Romania, and Tonga. The 2017 international seasons started with the Americas Rugby Championship where Augspurger got his first start on the Wing against Brazil. The Eagles went on to win the 2017 ARC Championship against the Argentina XV, where he started on the wing and was named the captain. That following summer the Eagles had to qualify for the 2019 Rugby World Cup. Augspurger was captain and started against Ireland in New Jersey Red Bull Arena. He then started the next 3 tests against Georgia and two games against Canada. The USA qualified that summer, beating Canada overwhelming in the second test in San Diego, California. It was the USA Men's XVs first ever RWC qualification as Americas #1. In the fall of 2017, Augspurger was selected off the bench by interim Head Coach Dave Hewett for tests against Germany and Georgia. 

By 2018, the Major League Rugby professional competition had begun. Augspurger signed for the San Diego Legion under Head Coach Rob Hoadley. In 2018, Nate was again selected for the 2018 Americas Rugby Championship which was placed in the middle of the MLR season. He started every match, both at scrum half and at wing for new Eagles Head Coach Gary Gold. He started on the wing and captained the USA in another overwhelming victory (61-19 over Uruguay) to become back-to-back champions of the ARC. These two championships were the first ever trophies won by the USA Eagles XV team. Augspurger returned to the Legion for the last season game and playoffs. He started on the wing and scored a late try in the playoff loss. Augspurger continued to play a pivotal role in the Eagles team. He was selected off the bench in the first ever Tier 1 nation victory over Scotland in 2018. He added to his try total that summer. Entering the 2018 fall, the USA Eagles were undefeated, they had NZ Maori, Samoa and Ireland, to finish the year. However, in the fall 2018 Augspurger before Nate was selected to captain and start on the wing against the NZ Maori, he discovered he had a ruptured quad tendon which required surgery. He remained focused going into the 2019 San Diego Legion season and 2019 Rugby World Cup. 

Augspurger missed only the first week of the 2019 MLR season and then played in every game for the Legion on the way to a 13-3 record and home field advantage. The Legion lost in the championship match, on the last play of the game to the Seattle Seawolves. Augspurger was named the MLR First XV team at scrum half. After the Legion season, Augspurger reported to the USA Eagles RWC preparation. He starred off the bench against Samoa and Japan in the Pacific Nations Cup. After that tour, Augspurger was named to the 2019 Rugby World Cup USA Eagles team. At the Rugby World Cup, Augspurger missed out against England and France but then was selected off the bench for the Argentina and Tonga matches.
Augspurger reported back to the San Diego Legion for MLR 2020. This season was cancelled shortly in, after the Legion were 5-0 to start the competition. 
In 2021, Augspurger continued his rugby representation for the Legion and the USA Eagles. He managed 3 MLR matches before fracturing his ankle against the, former LA Giltinis, opposition. Nate returned from injury in 9 weeks, he resumed his season. He came off the bench in one match and started the last two matches at scrum half to finish the 2021 Legion Season. He went on to be selected again for the USA Eagles. The Eagles summer tour was a RWC Qualification for 2023 and they had to beat Canada by aggregate in two test matches. Augspurger came off the bench against Canada in a loss. It was the same for him in the home match where the Eagles handily beat the Canadians and would move onto play Uruguay for Americas #2 spot. Augspurger would come off the bench in both matches, a win at home and a loss in Uruguay. The Eagles had one more test macth on schedule and it was against the All Blacks. Augspurger would start at scrum half in front of 40,000 people at Fedex Field in Washington D.C. He died his hair blonde for the first time ever in his career before the match. He stood out in the land slide defeat. Augspurger became the first ever USA Eagle to score a try against the All Blacks. He raised the tempo and serviced his close friend, and teammate, Ryan Matyas who finished a one on one try in the match. Augspurger glorified his Christian faith with his performance. 

In 2022, he would continue with San Diego Legion. The Legion were 5-3 when Augspurger went down against the Utah Warriors with a knee injury. He would spend the next 8 weeks rehabbing his injury and return to play schedule. He came off the bench in their last match of the season. The Legion finished the season 8-8 and due to MLR disqualification, qualified for the playoffs. Augspurger would start, score a try and play 60 minutes before being substituted in the 19-43 loss to Seattle. Again, he would be selected to represent the Eagles in their quest for 2023 RWC.

Personal life
Augspurger is married to Rosie Augspurger. Augspurger is a Christian.

References

Living people
1990 births
American rugby union players
Rugby union scrum-halves
Pan American Games medalists in rugby sevens
Pan American Games bronze medalists for the United States
Sportspeople from Minneapolis
San Diego Legion players
Rugby sevens players at the 2015 Pan American Games
United States international rugby union players
Medalists at the 2015 Pan American Games